Mpanda Airport  is an airport in western Tanzania serving the town of Mpanda and the surrounding Katavi Region. It is on the southeastern side of the town. The UN Refugee Agency UNHCR helped the Government of Tanzania to finance the upgrade of the airstrip into an airport as a gesture of its appreciation for hosting Burundian refugees for more than 30 years.

The airport was officially opened by the Tanzanian Vice President Mohamed Gharib Bilal on 24 November 2012. The airport will help improve access to the Katavi National Park.

Airlines and destinations

See also

 List of airports in Tanzania
 Transport in Tanzania

References

External links
OurAirports - Mpanda
OpenStreetMap - Mpanda

Airports in Tanzania
Buildings and structures in the Katavi Region